East Mount Carmel is a small unincorporated community near the southwestern corner of White River Township in Gibson County, Indiana.  The community is home to around 50 people.

History
East Mount Carmel was founded in ca. 1885. It lies east of Mount Carmel, Illinois, hence the name.

The post office which East Mount Carmel once contained was called Fetters due to the similarity of the village's name to Carmel, Indiana. The Fetters post office operated from 1897 until 1907.

Geography

The Patoka River meets the Wabash just north of the community, and the Gibson Generating Station complex surrounds the community to the south and east.

References

Unincorporated communities in Gibson County, Indiana
Unincorporated communities in Indiana